Regularization may refer to:

 Regularization (linguistics)
 Regularization (mathematics)
 Regularization (physics)
 Regularization (solid modeling)
 Regularization Law, an Israeli law intended to retroactively legalize settlements

See also 
 Matrix regularization